James Woodbury Perkins, Jr., (September 16, 1840August 18, 1892) was an American businessman and Republican politician.  He was a member of the Wisconsin State Assembly, representing Adams and Marquette counties in the 1885 and 1887 sessions.  As a young man, he served in the Union Army through the entire American Civil War.

Biography
James W. Perkins, Jr., was born in Warner, New Hampshire, on September 16, 1840.  He received an academic education and moved to Wisconsin in 1857, settling at New Chester, in Adams County.

At the outbreak of the American Civil War, Perkins volunteered for service in the Union Army.  On September 6, 1861, he was enrolled as a private in Company H of the 11th Wisconsin Infantry Regiment.  With the 11th Wisconsin Infantry, he participated in the fighting in the western theater of the war, and was involved in several of the important battles of the Vicksburg campaign.  He was promoted to corporal, and later to sergeant.  At the expiration of his three year enlistment in 1864, he re-enlisted as a veteran and continued with his regiment until the end of the war.  He mustered out with his regiment on September 4, 1865.

After returning from the war, he worked as a dealer of agricultural equipment.  He became involved in local politics and served as justice of the peace, town clerk, postmaster, and town chairman.  He also served four years as chairman of the board of supervisors of Adams County.

He was elected to the Wisconsin State Assembly in 1884, running on the Republican Party ticket and defeating Democratic incumbent Samuel Tanner.  He was re-elected in 1886, but did not run for a third term in 1888 and left office in January 1889.  During the 1887 session, he served as chairman of the committee on charitable and penal institutions.

He relocated to Westfield, Wisconsin, in neighboring Marquette County, after his term in the Assembly.  He died at his home in Westfield on August 18, 1892.

Personal life and family
James Perkins' father, James Woodbury Perkins, Sr., was a physician and Christian minister.  The Perkins family were direct descendants of John Perkins, a British colonist from Gloucestershire who settled in the Massachusetts Bay Colony in 1631.

James Perkins, Jr., married twice.  His first wife was Mary A. Atkins of Milton, Wisconsin.  They married on January 1, 1866, and had at least four children before her death in 1874.  Perkins then married Martha M. Keller of Philadelphia on November 8, 1874, and had at least three more children, though two of those (twins) died in infancy.

Electoral history

Wisconsin Assembly (1884, 1886)

| colspan="6" style="text-align:center;background-color: #e9e9e9;"| General Election, November 8, 1884

| colspan="6" style="text-align:center;background-color: #e9e9e9;"| General Election, November 2, 1886

References

1840 births
1892 deaths
People from Warner, New Hampshire
Politicians from Rochester, New York
People from Adams County, Wisconsin
People from Westfield, Marquette County, Wisconsin
People of Wisconsin in the American Civil War
Businesspeople from Wisconsin
County officials in Wisconsin
Republican Party members of the Wisconsin State Assembly
19th-century American politicians
19th-century American businesspeople